Jacobus Houbraken (25 December 1698 – 14 November 1780) was a Dutch engraver and the son of the artist and biographer Arnold Houbraken (1660–1719), whom he assisted in producing a published record of the lives of artists from the Dutch Golden Age.

Biography 
Jacobus was born in Dordrecht, and learned the art of engraving from his father. In 1707 he moved to Amsterdam, where for years he helped his father with his magnum opus, his art historical work The Great Theatre of Dutch Painters (1718–1721). When his father died he assisted his mother with the last proofs of the manuscript before publishing. With this project he started his portraits of Netherlandish celebrities, that are today in many cases the only likenesses left of these people.  He was influenced by studying the works of Cornelis Cort, Jonas Suyderhoef, Gerard Edelinck and the Visschers.  He died, aged 81, in Amsterdam.

Works 
Houbraken devoted himself almost entirely to portraiture. His work became famous through his collaboration with the historian Thomas Birch and artist George Vertue, on the project entitled, Heads of Illustrious Persons of Great Britain, published in parts in London from 1743 to 1752. After that, during the years 1752–59 he worked with the historian Jan Wagenaar (1709–1773) on his 21 part Vaderlandsche historie, working for the publisher Isaac Tirion in Amsterdam. With this project of biographies of celebrated figures, he annotated his work with notes about the original paintings.

Among his best works are scenes from the comedy of "De Ontdekte Schijndeugd", executed in his eightieth year, after Cornelis Troost, who was called by his countrymen the Dutch Hogarth. Houbraken also engraved the portraits for Jan van Gool's Nieuwe schouburg der Nederlantsche kunstschilders (Den Haag, 1750–51).

Legacy 
His oeuvre of more than 400 portrait engravings form an important record for art provenance. His portraits were often set in an oval frame, with a subtitle with the subject's claim to fame. Under that in small letters, he placed his notes about the original oil portrait. Some examples:

References 

Ver Huell, A., Jacobus Houbraken et son œuvre (Arnhem, 1875), includes a full description of 120 engraved works.

External links 

 National Portrait Gallery – Person – Jacobus Houbraken

1698 births
1780 deaths
Engravers from Amsterdam
Portrait engravers
Artists from Dordrecht
18th-century Dutch artists